Naimabad (also Romanized as Na‘īmābād) is a village in Sarpaniran Rural District, in the Central District of Pasargad County, Fars Province, Iran. At the 2006 census, its population was 532, in 130 families.

References 

Populated places in Pasargad County